Bok choy (American English, Canadian English, and Australian English), pak choi (British English) or pok choi (Brassica rapa subsp. chinensis) is a type of Chinese cabbage, used as food. Chinensis varieties do not form heads and have green leaf blades with lighter bulbous bottoms instead, forming a cluster reminiscent of mustard greens. It has a flavor between spinach and water chestnuts but is slightly sweeter, with a mildly peppery undertone. The green leaves have a stronger flavor than the white bulb.

Chinensis varieties are popular in southern China, East Asia, and Southeast Asia. Being winter-hardy, they are increasingly grown in Northern Europe. Now considered a subspecies of Brassica rapa, this group was originally classified as its own species under the name Brassica chinensis by Carl Linnaeus. They are a member of the family of Brassicaceae or Cruciferae, also commonly known as the mustards, the crucifers, or the cabbage family.

Spelling and naming variations

Other than the ambiguous term "Chinese cabbage", the most widely used name in North America for the chinensis variety is simply bok choy (Cantonese for "white vegetable") or siu bok choy (Cantonese, for "small white vegetable"; as opposed to dai bok choy meaning "big white vegetable" which refers to the larger Napa cabbage). It can also be spelled pak choi, bok choi, and pak choy. In the UK and South Africa, the term pak choi is used. Less commonly, the descriptive English names Chinese chard, Chinese mustard, celery mustard, and spoon cabbage are also employed.

In Australia, the New South Wales Department of Primary Industries has redefined many transcribed names to refer to specific cultivars. In addition, they have introduced the word buk choy to refer to a specific kind of cabbage distinct from pak choy.

In Mandarin Chinese, the common name is 青菜 qing cai ("green vegetable") or 小白菜 xiao bai cai ("small white vegetable"). Although it is simply called 白菜 baak choi ("white vegetable") in Cantonese, the same characters pronounced bai cai by Mandarin speakers are preferably used as the name for Napa cabbage.

What is labelled Bok Choy may come in 2 forms: white bok choy or Shanghai bok choy ( or ). White bok choy is usually more expensive and has a dark crinkly colored leaves and stem portions that are white and crisp texture that is more suitable to Cantonese style cooking, stir fries, and simple or raw preparations. Shanghai bok choy has greater availability in most American markets, and has mild-tasting spoon-shaped leaves that are lighter green with stems that are jade green instead of white. The texture of Shanghai bok choy is less crisp, and it gets slimy if overcooked, but otherwise can often be substituted for white bok choy.

Culinary use
Bok choi cooks in 2 to 3 minutes by steaming, stir-frying, or simmering in water (8 minutes if steamed whole). The leaves cook more quickly than the stem. It is used in similar ways to other leafy vegetables such as spinach and cabbage. It can also be eaten raw.

Preserving
Bok choy, dried, is saltier and sweeter. Bok choy, pickled, remains edible for months. Immature plants have the sweetest, tenderest stems and leaves.

Nutritional value

See the table for the nutritional content of bok choy. The raw vegetable is 95% water, 2% carbohydrates, 1% protein and less than 1% fat. In a  reference serving, raw bok choy provides 54 kilojoules (13 food calories) of food energy and is a rich source (20% or more of the Daily Value, DV) of vitamin A (30% DV), vitamin C (54% DV) and vitamin K (44% DV), while providing folate, vitamin B6 and calcium in moderate amounts (10–17% DV).

History

Bok choy evolved in China, where it has been cultivated since the 5th century AD.

Gallery

See also
Gai lan
Choy sum
List of leaf vegetables

References

External links

Asian vegetables
Brassica
Cantonese cuisine
Leaf vegetables